Zuccarelli is a surname, and may refer to:

Émile Zuccarelli (born 1940), French politician from Corsica 
Francesco Zuccarelli (1702–1788), Italian painter
Katia Zuccarelli (born 1992), Canadian pop-country singer and songwriter
Paul Zuccarelli (1886–1913), Italian racecar driver